Luis Fernando Martínez Castellanos (born 14 December 1991) is a Guatemalan football player who currently plays as a forward for Liga Nacional club Cobán Imperial.

International career
Martínez was first called up to the Guatemala squad in 2015. He scored his first goal for Guatemala in a 3–1 victory over Honduras.

Career statistics

International

International goals
Scores and results list Guatemala's goal tally first.

Honours
Xelajú 
Liga Nacional de Guatemala: Clausura 2012

Guastatoya
Liga Nacional de Guatemala: Clausura 2018, Apertura 2018, Apertura 2020

References

External links
 
 

1995 births
Living people
Guatemalan footballers
Guatemala international footballers
Xelajú MC players
People from Baja Verapaz Department
Association football forwards
2021 CONCACAF Gold Cup players